The International Association of Arson Investigators (abbreviated IAAI) is a professional association of individuals who conduct fire investigations. The IAAI provides resources for training, research, and technology for fire investigators around the world. It is based in Crofton, Maryland, United States.

This organization was formed and chartered as a nonprofit organization in Louisville Kentucky. President George Parker based on the wishes of the membership; filed the request for incorporation in the latter part of 1949 The IAAI received its charter December 4, 1951. The State of Kentucky required an “Annual verification of IAAI Incorporation” filed with the Secretary of State. This was to include the name of an individual within the State of Kentucky who would be responsible for any actions of the IAAI. George Parker (President 1949-50) was the first to fill this position followed by John T. Underwood (State Fire Marshal, Frankfort Kentucky). The official title within the State of Kentucky was “Corporation Process Agent”; the individual holding the position became an Ex-Officio Member of the IAAI Board of Directors. Thus, the IAAI became a viable and functional association due to the need and necessity of training and education in the uncharted waters of fire and arson investigation, which was non-existent at that time.

The first comprehensive organizational study of the International Association of Arson Investigators was conducted in 1999. The consultant retained to conduct that study presented the IAAI Board of Directors with a report of the results of his study, entitled “Preparing for the Challenges of the 21st Century, A Study in Organizational Effectiveness".The methodology employed in the preparation of the first study included soliciting input from the existing Board, Committees, Chapters, Executive Director, Office Manager, staff and other stakeholder groups. A strategic plan was ultimately developed by the consultant and adopted by the Board in 2000. That plan established goals, objectives and strategies for the association to pursue. Specific action plans designated as 1, 3 and 5-year goals were identified. The document has been available for the entire membership on the IAAI website. In the fall of 2003 President Sneed appointed a Strategic Planning Committee. The committee was charged with reviewing the current plan and development of the next 5-year strategic plan. The committee consisted of 2nd VP Kirk Hankins, Executive Director Alan Clark, Director Tom Fee, Director Joe Sesniak and Chapters Committee Chair Roger Krupp. A strategic plan is the roadmap of any business or association and requires constant review and referral by the governing body to succeed. The committee recognizes the trust placed in us by the Executives and Board. The committee has come to realize the enormity of such an undertaking however an appreciation of the importance of the work has been our inspiration. We hope that the ultimate approval and implementation of the plan will guide the IAAI to fully achieve her vision.

See also
National Association of Fire Investigators

External links
International Association of Arson Investigators - Official Website

Law enforcement-related professional associations
Fire investigation
Firefighting in the United States